The People's Republic of China competed at the 2016 Summer Olympics in Rio de Janeiro, Brazil, from 5 to 21 August 2016. This was the nation's tenth appearance at the Summer Olympics since its debut in 1952.

Medalists

|  style="text-align:left; width:78%; vertical-align:top;"|

|  style="text-align:left; width:22%; vertical-align:top;"|

Multiple medallists

The following Team China competitors won several medals at the 2016 Olympic Games.

Competitors

| width=78% align=left valign=top |
The following is the list of number of competitors participating in the Games. Note that reserves in fencing, field hockey, football, and handball are counted as athletes:

Archery

Chinese archers qualified each for the men's and women's events after having secured a top eight finish in their respective team recurves at the 2015 World Archery Championships in Copenhagen, Denmark. The Chinese archery team was named to the Olympic roster on July 6, 2016.

Men

Women

Athletics

Chinese athletes have so far achieved qualifying standards in the following athletics events (up to a maximum of 3 athletes in each event):

Following the end of the qualifying period on July 11, a total of 56 athletes (27 men and 29 women) were named to the Chinese track and field roster for the Games. Among them featured defending Olympic champion Chen Ding and bronze medalists Wang Zhen and Qieyang Shijie in race walking, high jumper and 2015 Worlds silver medalist Zhang Guowei, sprinter Su Bingtian, shot putter Gong Lijiao, and hammer thrower Zhang Wenxiu.

Track & road events
Men

Women

Field events
Men

Women

Badminton

China has qualified a total of fifteen badminton players for each of the following events into the Olympic tournament based on the BWF World Rankings as of 5 May 2016: two entries each in the men's and women's singles, as well as two pairs each in the men's, women's, and mixed doubles.

Men

Women

Mixed

Basketball

Men's tournament

China men's basketball team qualified for the Olympics by winning the gold medal and clinching the outright Olympic berth at the 2015 FIBA Asia Championship in Changsha. They dominated the tournament, going 9-0 and once again showing they were the clear top team in Asia. This team included newly drafted star center Zhou Qi from the Houston Rockets.

Team roster

Group play

Women's tournament

China women's basketball team qualified for the Olympics with a quarterfinal victory at the 2016 FIBA World Olympic Qualifying Tournament in Nantes, France.

Team roster

Group play

Boxing

China has entered eleven boxers to compete in each of the following weight classes into the Olympic boxing tournament. Lü Bin and 2012 Olympian Zhang Jiawei became the first Chinese boxers to be selected to the Olympic team with a top two finish of their respective division in the AIBA Pro Boxing series, while Liu Wei earned a box-off victory at the 2015 World Championships to join the Chinese boxing team.

Seven further boxers (four men and three women), including 2012 Olympic silver medalist Ren Cancan, had claimed their Olympic spots at the 2016 Asia & Oceania Qualification Tournament in  Qian'an. Meanwhile, Shan Jun secured an additional Olympic place on the Chinese roster at the 2016 AIBA World Qualifying Tournament in Baku, Azerbaijan.

Men

Women

Canoeing

Slalom
Chinese canoeists have qualified a maximum of one boat in each of the following classes through the 2015 ICF Canoe Slalom World Championships and the 2016 Asian Championships.

Sprint
Chinese canoeists have qualified one boat in each of the following events through the 2015 ICF Canoe Sprint World Championships. Meanwhile, one additional boat (men's C-1 1000 m) was awarded to the Chinese squad at the 2015 Asian Canoe Sprint Championships in Palembang, Indonesia, as the unused quota spot had been passed to the highest finisher not yet qualified.

Men

Women

Qualification Legend: FA = Qualify to final (medal); FB = Qualify to final B (non-medal)

Cycling

Track
Following the completion of the 2016 UCI Track Cycling World Championships, Chinese riders have accumulated spots in both men's and women's team pursuit, and women's team sprint, as well as the women's omnium. As a result of their place in the women's team sprint, China has won the right to enter two riders in both women's sprint and men's keirin. China failed to win a quota place in the men's team sprint, but earned a single place in the men's sprint by virtue of his final individual UCI Olympic rankings in that event.

The full track cycling team, highlighted by Worlds sprint champion Zhong Tianshi, was named as part of the official team announcement for the Games on July 18, 2016.

Sprint

Team sprint

Qualification legend: FA=Gold medal final; FB=Bronze medal final

Pursuit

Keirin

Omnium

Mountain biking
Chinese mountain bikers qualified for one men's and one women's quota place into the Olympic cross-country race, by virtue of a top two national finish, respectively, at the 2015 Asian Championships. These places were awarded to Wang Zhen and Yao Ping.

Diving 

Chinese divers qualified for the following individual spots and synchronized teams at the 2016 Olympic Games by having achieved a top three finish from the 2015 FINA World Championships. A total of thirteen divers (six men and seven women), led by London 2012 champions Wu Minxia (springboard) and Chen Ruolin (platform), were named to the Olympic team on May 10, 2016, based on their results in five Olympic trial meets.

Men

Women

Equestrian

China has entered one eventing rider into the Olympic equestrian competition by virtue of a top two finish from a combined group of Africa, Middle East, Asia & Oceania in the individual FEI Olympic rankings.

Eventing

Fencing

Chinese fencers have qualified a full squad each in the women's team épée by virtue of their top 4 national finish in the FIE Olympic Team Rankings, while the men's foil team has claimed the spot as the highest ranking team from Asia outside the world's top four.

Foil fencer Le Huilin secured a spot on the Chinese team by finishing among the top 14 in the FIE Adjusted Official Rankings, while Jiao Yunlong (men's épée) and Shen Chen (women's sabre), along with Sun Wei (men's sabre) and Le's teammate Liu Yongshi, did the same feat as one of the two highest-ranked fencers coming from the Asian zone. The fencing team was officially named to the Chinese roster on June 15, 2016, with Lei Sheng aiming to defend the Olympic men's foil title at his third straight Games.

Men

Women

Field hockey

Summary

Women's tournament

China women's field hockey team qualified for the Olympics by having achieved a top three finish at the 2014–15 Women's FIH Hockey World League Semifinals.

Team roster

Group play

Football

Women's tournament

China women's football team qualified for the Olympics by virtue of a top two finish at and by progressing to the gold medal match of the 2015–16 AFC Olympic Qualifying Tournament in Japan.

Team roster

Group play

Quarterfinal

Golf 

China has entered four golfers (two per gender) into the Olympic tournament. Li Haotong (world no. 141), Wu Ashun (world no. 129), Feng Shanshan (world no. 13) and Lin Xiyu (world no. 50) qualified directly among the top 60 eligible players for their respective individual events based on the IGF World Rankings as of 11 July 2016.

Gymnastics

Artistic
China fielded a full squad of five gymnasts in both the men's and women's artistic gymnastics events through a top eight finish each in the team all-around at the 2015 World Artistic Gymnastics Championships in Glasgow. The men's and women's gymnastics squads, led by London 2012 team champion Zhang Chenglong, were named to the Olympic roster at the conclusion of the Chinese Championships in Beijing on May 16, 2016. Notable absence in the roster was five-time Olympic medalist Zou Kai.

Men
Team

Individual finals

Women
Team

Individual finals

* Liu Tingting was recently replaced by Tan Jiaxin because of a hand injury while training a pac salto on the uneven bars.

Rhythmic
China has qualified a squad of rhythmic gymnasts for the group all-around by finishing in the top 10 (for group) at the 2015 World Championships in Stuttgart, Germany. Meanwhile, an additional Olympic berth had been awarded to the Chinese female gymnast, who participated in the individual all-around at the Olympic Test Event in Rio de Janeiro.

Trampoline
China has qualified a full squad of two gymnasts each in both men's and women's trampoline by virtue of a top eight finish at the 2015 World Championships in Odense, Denmark.

Judo

China has qualified a total of eight judokas for each of the following weight classes at the Games. Seven of them (three men and four women) were ranked among the top 22 eligible judokas for men and top 14 for women in the IJF World Ranking List of May 30, 2016, while Zhou Chao at women's middleweight (70 kg) earned a continental quota spot from the Asian region as the highest-ranked Chinese judoka outside of direct qualifying position.

Men

Women

Modern pentathlon

China has qualified a total of four modern pentathletes for the following events at the Games. London 2012 silver medalist Cao Zhongrong, fifth-place finalist Chen Qian, and rookies Su Haihang, and Liang Wanxia had claimed their Olympic spots at the 2015 Asia & Oceania Championships. Guo Jianli and Zhang Xiaonan became the third Chinese athlete in their respective events to qualify for Rio, as a result of their world ranking at the end of May 2016. With the rookies failing to guarantee their selection at the 2016 World Championships, the choice of four modern pentathletes going to the Games was determined by the NOC before the team was named on June 15; in the event, the Chinese team had decided to keep their Olympic veterans instead, along with Guo and Zhang.

Rowing

China has qualified five boats for each of the following rowing classes into the Olympic regatta.  Four rowing crews had confirmed Olympic places for their boats each in the men's lightweight four, and all small-boat classes for women (except coxless pair)  at the 2015 FISA World Championships in Lac d'Aiguebelette, France, while the men's lightweight double sculls rowers had added one boat to the Chinese roster as a result of their gold medal triumph at the 2016 Asia & Oceania Continental Qualification Regatta in Chungju, South Korea.

Two further boats was awarded to the Chinese rowers, who finished among the top four crews each in the women's pair and quadruple sculls at the 2016 European & Final Qualification Regatta in Lucerne, Switzerland.

Men

Women

Qualification Legend: FA=Final A (medal); FB=Final B (non-medal); FC=Final C (non-medal); FD=Final D (non-medal); FE=Final E (non-medal); FF=Final F (non-medal); SA/B=Semifinals A/B; SC/D=Semifinals C/D; SE/F=Semifinals E/F; QF=Quarterfinals; R=Repechage

Sailing

Chinese sailors have qualified one boat in each of the following classes through the 2014 ISAF Sailing World Championships, the individual fleet Worlds, and Asian qualifying regattas. A total of eight sailors, led by two-time Olympian and defending Laser Radial champion Xu Lijia, had been selected to the Chinese Olympic team for Rio 2016, following the completion of the ISAF World Cup meet (April 26 to May 1) in Hyères, France.

Men

Women

M = Medal race; EL = Eliminated – did not advance into the medal race

Shooting

Chinese shooters have achieved quota places for the following events by virtue of their best finishes at the 2014 ISSF World Shooting Championships, the 2015 ISSF World Cup series, and Asian Championships, as long as they obtained a minimum qualifying score (MQS) by March 31, 2016. To assure their nomination to the Olympic team, shooters must finish in the top two of each individual event at the Olympic Trials for rifle & pistol (March 20 to 29) in Beijing.

The rifle and pistol shooting team was announced on March 31, 2016, featuring Olympic champions Yi Siling, Guo Wenjun, married couple Pang Wei and Du Li, and upcoming four-time Olympians Zhu Qinan and Chen Ying. The shotgun team, led by Olympic medalists Hu Binyuan (men's double trap)  and Wei Ning (women's skeet), rounded out the Chinese roster at the Olympic Trials on May 13, 2016.

Men

Women

Qualification Legend: Q = Qualify for the next round; q = Qualify for the bronze medal (shotgun)

Swimming

Chinese swimmers have so far achieved qualifying standards in the following events (up to a maximum of 2 swimmers in each event at the Olympic Qualifying Time (OQT), and potentially 1 at the Olympic Selection Time (OST)): To assure their selection to the Olympic team, swimmers must finish in the top two of each individual pool events under the Olympic qualifying cut at the Chinese National Championships & Olympic Trials (April 3 to 10) in Foshan and the Summer Championships (June 6 to 9) in Ganzhou.

A total of 45 swimmers (19 men and 26 women) were officially named to the Chinese roster at the end of the qualifying period on July 3, 2016, featuring double Olympic gold medalists Sun Yang and Ye Shiwen, and freestyle sprinter and 2015 Worlds champion Ning Zetao.

Men

Women

Synchronized swimming

China has fielded a squad of nine synchronized swimmers to compete in the women's duet and team events, by virtue of their top national finish for Asia at the 2015 FINA World Championships.

Table tennis

China has fielded a team of six athletes into the table tennis competition at the Games. London 2012 champions Ma Long and Li Xiaoxia secured the Olympic spot each in the men's and women's singles as the highest-ranked player coming from the East Asia zone at the Asian Qualification Tournament in Hong Kong. Meanwhile, 2015 World champion Ding Ning and reigning Olympic champion Zhang Jike were automatically selected among the top 22 eligible players each in their respective singles events based on the ITTF Olympic Rankings.

Xu Xin and world no. 1 seed Liu Shiwen were each awarded the third spot to build the men's and women's teams for the Games as the top Asian nation, respectively, in the ITTF Olympic Rankings.

Men

Women

Taekwondo

China entered four athletes into the taekwondo competition at the Olympics. Zheng Shuyin and two-time Olympic flyweight champion Wu Jingyu qualified automatically for their respective weight classes by finishing in the top 6 WTF Olympic rankings. Meanwhile, Zhao Shuai and Qiao Sen secured the remaining spots on the Chinese team by virtue of their top two finish in the men's flyweight (58 kg) and men's heavyweight category (+80 kg), respectively, at the 2016 Asian Qualification Tournament in Manila, Philippines.

Tennis

China has entered five tennis players into the Olympic tournament. Peng Shuai (world no. 265) and Zhang Shuai (world no. 62) qualified directly for the women's singles, as two of the top 56 eligible players in the WTA World Rankings as of June 6, 2016. Meanwhile, rookies Xu Yifan and Zheng Saisai were added to the Olympic tennis team, as China's top-ranked pair outside of direct qualifying position in the women's doubles.

Following the withdrawal of several tennis players from the Games, Wang Qiang (world no. 73) and Zheng (world no. 86) received spare ITF Olympic places to join Peng and Zhang in the women's singles.

Triathlon

China has entered two triathletes to compete at the Games. London 2012 Olympian Bai Faquan and Wang Lianyuan were each selected as the highest-ranked triathlete from Asia in the men's and women's event, respectively, based on the ITU Points List.

Volleyball

Beach
China women's beach volleyball team qualified directly for the Olympics by virtue of their nation's top 15 placement in the FIVB Olympic Rankings as of June 13, 2016. The place was awarded to rookies Wang Fan and Yue Yuan.

Indoor

Women's tournament

China women's volleyball team qualified for the Olympics by reaching the top two towards the final match of the 2015 FIVB Volleyball Women's World Cup in Japan.

Team roster

Group play

Quarterfinal

Semifinal

Gold medal match

Water polo

Summary

Women's tournament

China women's water polo team qualified for the Olympics by winning the gold medal and securing a lone outright berth at the Asian Championships in Foshan.

Team roster

Group play

Quarterfinal

Classification semifinal (5–8)

Seventh place match

Weightlifting

Chinese weightlifters have qualified a maximum of six men's and four women's quota places for the Rio Olympics based on their combined team standing by points at the 2014 and 2015 IWF World Championships. The team must allocate these places to individual athletes by June 20, 2016.

The full weightlifting squad was named at the internal selection trials in Beijing on July 6 and 7, 2016, including former Olympic champions like Long Qingquan (men's 56 kg) and Lü Xiaojun (men's 77 kg).

Men

Women

Wrestling

China has qualified a total of thirteen wrestlers for each the following weight classes into the Olympic tournament. Four of them finished among the top six to book Olympic spots in all women's freestyle events (except 58 & 63 kg) at the 2015 World Championships, while five additional berths were awarded to Chinese wrestlers, who progressed to the top two finals at the 2016 Asian Qualification Tournament.

Four further wrestlers had claimed the remaining Olympic slots to round out the Chinese roster in separate Olympic Qualification Tournaments; three of them at the initial meet in Ulaanbaatar and one more in men's freestyle 86 kg at the final meet in Istanbul.

Men's freestyle

Men's Greco-Roman

Women's freestyle

See also
China at the 2016 Summer Paralympics

References

External links 

 

Olympics
2016
Nations at the 2016 Summer Olympics